Benedetto Oliva (died 1576) was a Roman Catholic prelate who served as Bishop of Trevico (1575–1576).

Biography
On 2 September 1575, Benedetto Oliva was appointed during the papacy of Pope Gregory XIII as Bishop of Trevico.
He served as Bishop of Trevico until his death on 13 January 1576.

References

External links and additional sources
 (for the Chronology of Bishops using non-Latin names) 
 (for the Chronology of Bishops using non-Latin names)  

16th-century Italian Roman Catholic bishops
Bishops appointed by Pope Gregory XIII
1576 deaths